Lee Ji-rin (born 1981), better known as Humming Urban Stereo is a South Korean electropop singer-songwriter. The one-man band debuted in 2004 with the extended play, Short Cake, and has since released five full-length albums. Guest vocalists, notably the late Lee Jin-hwa (aka Humming Girl) and Shina-E, have appeared on many of Humming Urban Stereo's songs.

Career 
Humming Urban Stereo's first album was Very Very Nice! and Short Cake, released in January 2005. Its most popular song, "Hawaiian Couple", a top ten hit that reportedly sold over 500 000 downloads, came from the band's second album, Purple Drop, released in March 2006. Hawaiian Couple was also featured in the film My Love, a popular 2007 South Korean romantic comedy, directed by Lee Han.

In February 2007 the band released its third album, Baby Love.

In March 2012, the main female vocal "Humming Girl" Lee Jin-hwa died in Japan. Her cause of death was a heart disease. Lee Jin-hwa flew to Japan to study abroad in 2007 after singing for Humming Urban Stereo, and had been living alone since for six or seven years.

In 2013, Humming Urban Stereo came back with "Sparkle," a full-length album under Ji Rin's own label.

For the band's 10th anniversary, they released the album "Reform," covering old hits such as 'Scully Doesn't Know', 'Insomnia', 'Bullshit', 'Salad Day' and their biggest hit 'Hawaiian Couple' having guest vocals from mainstream artists such as G.Na, NS Yoon G, Narsha of Brown Eyed Girls, and Ashley of Ladies' Code.

Discography

Studio albums

Compilation albums

Extended plays

Awards and nominations

References

External links

South Korean electronic music groups
K-pop music groups
South Korean singer-songwriters